Zhongshan Wharf (Chinese:中山码头): located along Yangtze River, is a wharf in Xiaguan. It is near wharf No.7 of Port of Nanjing.

Background
In 1899, Nanjing became a treaty port. Foreign ship companies began to build wharfs in Xiaguan, including British company Jardine Matheson (1900), Japanese Swire (1901), Japanese Osaka (1902).

In 1908, Jinpu Railway was under construction. In 1910, Jinpu began to construct wharfs along the Pukou river, completing 10 wharfs for passenger and freight transport by 1914. Many wharfs were built along Xiaguan River, including one for passenger ferry and one for train ferry.

Zhongshan Wharf changed from passenger transport called Dasheng Wharf, which was located near Jinling Guan. In October 1914, the Jinpu port authorities rented West Fort Battery from Xiaguan commercial port authorities. The wharf was moved to Nanjing and named after Feihong Ferry. In 1921, Feihong sank and was replaced by Chengping Ferry. In 1928, Jinpu began to build a new wharf at the beginning of Zhongshan Road. On March 28, 1935, the project was accomplished. In 1936, it came to use, and was renamed Zhongshan Wharf.

Development
After the People’s Republic of China was founded, the waiting hall of Zhongshan Wharf was expanded, from 370.59 square meters to 775.2 square meters.

References

Buildings and structures in Nanjing
Transport in Nanjing
Wharves